Alvin J. Bronstein (June 8, 1928 – October 24, 2015) was an American lawyer, and founder and Director Emeritus of the National Prison Project of the American Civil Liberties Union Foundation. According to his ACLU biography, 'he has argued numerous prisoners’ rights cases in federal trial and appellate
courts as well as the Supreme Court of the United States. He was a consultant to state and federal correctional agencies, appeared as an expert witness on numerous occasions and has edited or authored books and articles on human rights and corrections'.

Early life and education
Bronstein's Ukrainian-Polish Jewish family had moved to the United States to seek refuge from the pogroms. He was born in Brooklyn to Louis and Lillian (née Spielman) Bronstein, who both worked in sales. Bronstein attended Erasmus Hall High School, then the City College of New York before graduating from New York Law School with an LL.B.

Career
He began his career working in the American South during the Civil Rights Movement, becoming the Chief Staff Counsel of the Lawyers’ Constitutional Defense Committee from 1964 to 1968 in Jackson, Mississippi. He litigated civil rights cases during that time in Mississippi, Alabama, and Louisiana, and represented the major civil rights organizations in the South. He was a Fellow at the Kennedy School of Government, Harvard University, from 1969 to 1971. He was Pace Law School’s Practitioner-in-Residence in 2009.
 
He served as the director of the National Prison Project from 1972 until 1995. During this time, he argued three cases in the United States Supreme Court, Hudson v. McMillan (1992), Block v. Rutherford (1984), and Montanye v. Haynes (1976). After his departure from the National Prison Project, he has been a consultant for the ACLU. He also served as a board member of Penal Reform International (London) and a member of the Assembly of Delegates for the World Organization Against Torture (Geneva).

He had three children from his first marriage to Kate Ransohoff- Lisa Snitzer of Philadelphia, Susie Renner of Piedmont, Calif., and Laura Zatta of Lowell, Mass.; a daughter from his second marriage to Julie Bronstein- Sarah Bronstein of Berkeley, Calif. He is survived by his wife of 33 years, Jan Elvin. Their son, Benjamin Bronstein, lives in the District of Columbia. Bronstein also had seven grandchildren- Ian, Zoe, Sasha, Daniel, Ava, Corinna, and Sadie.

Bronstein died of Alzheimer's disease on October 24, 2015, in Centreville, Maryland.

Awards
 1989 MacArthur Foundation Fellowship
 1985, 1988, 1991, 1994 listed as one of the one hundred most influential lawyers in America by the National Law Journal in their triennial publication, Profiles in Power.
 Frederick Douglass award from the Southern Center for Human Rights
 He has also received awards from the following institutions:
 National Council on Crime and Delinquency
 The Fortune Society
 Offender Aid and Restoration
 University of Maine Law School
 Pennsylvania Prison Society
 The Prison Reform Trust (London, England)

Works
"Incarceration as a Failed Policy", Real Cost of Prisons, August 29, 2005
The Rights of prisoners: the basic ACLU guide to prisoners' rights, Authors David Rudovsky, Alvin J. Bronstein, Edward I. Koren, Southern Illinois University Press, 1988, 
Prisoners' self-help litigation manual, Authors James L. Potts, Alvin J. Bronstein, Lexington Books, 1976, 
Prisoners' rights, 1979, Volume 2, Authors Alvin J. Bronstein, Philip J. Hirschkop, Practising Law Institute, 1979
Representing prisoners, Authors Alvin J. Bronstein, Practising Law Institute, 1981

References

External links
"Panel 3: Transparency and Access of Independent Experts to All Places of Detention"

1928 births
2015 deaths
American lawyers
Harvard Kennedy School faculty
Pace University faculty
MacArthur Fellows
Deaths from Alzheimer's disease
New York Law School alumni
City College of New York alumni
Erasmus Hall High School alumni
American people of Russian-Jewish descent
Neurological disease deaths in Maryland
People from Brooklyn
American civil rights lawyers
Prison reformers